Getmetickets.net was a British-owned company that traded in sold-out tickets. Get Me Tickets charged premium prices for "hard-to-get" tickets at "sold out" events anywhere in the UK & Ireland. While many customers did get the tickets they purchased, others did not. The company was eventually accused of fraud for selling tickets that they did not own, and charging unfair prices for hard-to-get tickets that were not actually in their possession. The company and its owner Michael Rangos were fined several times by government standards agencies for these violations.

On 6 February 2006 Getmetickets.net was wound up in the public interest by the Insolvency Service following an investigation by the Department of Trade and Industry. The petition to wind up the company was heard by a court on 22 March 2006

References

External links
 BBC News/Watchdog 16 January 2007
 Festival Forum Complaints
 BBC News/Watchdog (report expired)
 BBC News/Watchdog (report expired)

Online retailers of the United Kingdom